WEC 20: Cinco de Mayhem was a mixed martial arts event held by World Extreme Cagefighting that took place on May 5, 2006 at Tachi Palace Hotel & Casino in Lemoore, California. WEC 20's main event was a heavyweight bout between Brian Olsen and Mike Kyle.

Results

See also
 World Extreme Cagefighting
 List of World Extreme Cagefighting champions
 List of WEC events
 2006 in WEC

References

External links
Official WEC website

World Extreme Cagefighting events
2006 in mixed martial arts
Mixed martial arts in California
Sports in Lemoore, California
2006 in sports in California